Austin Valley is a small ice-filled valley at the east side of Avalanche Ridge, in the Jones Mountains of Antarctica. It was mapped by the University of Minnesota Jones Mountains Party, 1960–61, and named by the Advisory Committee on Antarctic Names for Jerry W. Austin, aviation machinist's mate of U.S. Navy Squadron VX-6, a crew member on pioneering flights of LC-47 Dakota aircraft from Byrd Station to the Eights Coast area in November 1961.

References
 

Valleys of Antarctica
Landforms of Ellsworth Land